A KDL (short for Kernel Debug(ger) Land) is a term used on BeOS/Haiku and possibly other operating systems for a serious kernel error which causes the computer to drop into the kernel debugger.

While a KDL brought about by a buggy driver which is not crucial, such as a filesystem driver,  can be escaped from (with the command 'es'), it usually leaves the user needing to reboot.

Entering the kernel debugger 

The Kernel Debug(ger) Land can also be entered on BeOS/Haiku at any time by pressing Alt-SysReq-D on the keyboard while the system is running.

See also 
Screen of death
Haiku (operating system)
BeAPI

References

BeOS
Computer errors
Operating system kernels